This is a list of rugby teams in Ukraine, as per the 2011/2012 season.

Superliga
RC Antares
RC Argo
RC Batyari
RC Epokha-Politekhnik (Kyiv)
RC Kredo-63
RC Obolon-University
RC Olymp
RC Polytechnic (Odessa)
RC Roland
SC Sokil
RC TEX-A-C 

Rugby clubs
Ukraine